Laura (Marshallese:) is an island town situated in Marshall Islands. It is located in the west of Majuro Atoll. Marshall Islands International Airport is located on the island of Laura. A road connects the island of Laura to Djarrit.

On January 30, 1944, United States troops invaded and built a large base, Naval Base Majuro. 

The town was named by World War II GIs in reference to American actress Lauren Bacall. Djarrit, also known as Rita, was named in the same period for actress Rita Hayworth.

Climate

References

Populated places in the Marshall Islands
Majuro